The Guyana Chess Federation is a national organization that connects the various chess enthusiasts in Guyana. It is usually referred to as the GCF.

The GCF was founded in Georgetown, Guyana. Chess in Guyana is not as popular compared to other countries.  Some notable players are CM Ronuel Greenidge, FM Anthony Drayton, NA Rashad Hussain, WFM Maria Varona-Thomas, Wendell Meusa and Taffin Khan. Its current President is Frankie Farley.

Role
The GCF's most visible activity is organizing the National Chess Championships and National Junior Chess Championship. It is recognized by the FIDE, and respect FIDE rules and regulations.

Executive committee

 President - Frankie Farley
 Vice-President - Professor Gomathinyagam Subranium
 Director of Tournaments - NA Rashad Phoenixx Hussain
 Secretary        - Aneesa Maryam Hussain
 Treasurer        - Davion Mars
 National Trainer - FM Anthony Drayton
 Fundraiser       - Anand Ragnauth
 Committee Member - WFM Maria Varona-Thomas
 Committee Member - Nellisha Johnson
 Committee Member - Krishnanand Raghunandan
 Committee Member - Steve Leung

GCF's Champions (Juniors)

 2007–2008 – Kriskal Persaud (Ronald Roberts)
 2008–2009 – Kriskal Persaud (Taffin Khan)
 2009–2010 – Wendell Meusa (Cecil Cox)
 2010–2011 – Taffin Khan (Ron Motilall)
 2011–2012 – Taffin Khan (Haifeng Su)
 2012–2013 – Taffin Khan (Anthony Drayton)
 2013–2014 – Wendell Meusa (Haifeng Su)

 2016 -                  (Saeed Ali)
 2018 - CM Wendell Meusa (Joshua Gopaul)
 2019 - FM Anthony Drayton (Andre Jagnandan)
 2020 - CM Taffin Khan (Joshua Gopaul)

References

External links
 
 FIDE Directory
 

Guyana
Chess in Guyana
Chess
Chess organizations